The 1922–23 season was the 26th in the history of the Western Football League.

After many clubs left at the end of the previous season, the Western League once again reverted to a single division. The champions this season were Weymouth, for the first time in their history.

Final table
Two new clubs joined the league this season, and a single division of nine clubs was formed after Clandown, Coleford Athletic, Frome Town, Glastonbury, Horfield United, Paulton Rovers, Street, Timsbury Athletic, Torquay United and Welton Amateurs left the league.

Bath City, rejoining after leaving the league in 1921
Hanham Athletic

References

1922-23
1922–23 in Welsh football
1922–23 in English football leagues